Olof Arne Hegerfors (born 4 July 1942) is a Swedish sports journalist and television presenter. He is mostly known as a sports commentator at SVT and Canal Plus between 1969 until 2011. He was awarded the Stora Journalistpriset (The great journalist award) in 1992.

Hegerfors had a promising athletic career in football and had a contract offer from a French football club, OGC Nice. But after a serious knee injury he could not play anymore and moved on to a journalistic career. When Lars-Gunnar Björklund started a sports department at SVT (known as Sveriges Radio-TV until 1979) in Gothenburg and recruited Hegerfors.

In 2000 Hegerfors appeared in Markoolio's music video for his song "Mera mål", where he acted as himself. He has also presented entertainments shows for SVT, like "Kryzz" and "Det kommer mera". He won the Swedish television Kristallens Honour Award in 2008.

Hegerfors had made several memorable commentator works in ice hockey and football matches and was SVT's correspondent at the Heysel Stadium disaster in 1985 when 39 people died and 376 were injured during a UEFA Champions League final between Liverpool and Juventus. He also commentated the basketball final between the Soviet Union and the United States at the 1972 Olympic Games in which the Soviet Union won with 50–49 in a discussed judge decision in the last seconds.

Hegerfors is also known for making entertaining quips as a commentator.  In 2011, Hegerfors ended his working career.

Hegerfors has also published one book called Ralf: en gör så gôtt en kan!.

References

External links 

Swedish sports journalists
1942 births
Living people
People from Gothenburg
Swedish sports broadcasters
Swedish television hosts